McAllister Creek may refer to:

McAllister Creek (Iowa), a stream in Iowa
McAllister Creek (Puget Sound tributary), a stream in Washington